Ottenschlag is a municipality in the district of Zwettl in the Austrian state of Lower Austria.

Population

References

Cities and towns in Zwettl District